The 1958 All-Ireland Junior Hurling Championship was the 37th staging of the All-Ireland Junior Championship since its establishment by the Gaelic Athletic Association in 1912.

Limerick entered the championship as the defending champions.

The All-Ireland final was played on 5 October 1958 at Glebe Farm in Birmingham, between Cork and Warwickshire, in what was their first meeting in the final since 1955. Cork won the match by 7-10 to 4-02 to claim their eighth championship title overall and a first title since 1955.

Results

All-Ireland Junior Hurling Championship

All-Ireland semi-finals

All-Ireland home final

All-Ireland final

References

Junior
All-Ireland Junior Hurling Championship